Alfred Sharpe (1836–1908) was a notable New Zealand artist, architectural draughtsman, and writer. He was born in Tranmere, Cheshire, England, in about 1836.

References

1836 births
1908 deaths
People from Birkenhead
New Zealand artists
English emigrants to New Zealand